Ludwig Kotzebue (born 1946) is a retired Dutch-Surinamese heavyweight karateka. He won individual gold medals at the 1977 European Championships and 1981 World Games, and a team gold at the 1977 World Championships, together with Otti Roethof and John Reeberg.

After retiring from competitions and until 2011 Kotzebue worked as a karate teacher in Amsterdam. In the mid-1990s, for two and half years he was the head coach of the Dutch karate team.

References

External links
 

1946 births
Living people
Dutch male karateka
Surinamese male karateka
Surinamese emigrants to the Netherlands
Karate coaches
World Games gold medalists
Competitors at the 1981 World Games
20th-century Dutch people
21st-century Dutch people